Tangled Lives is a one-reel 1911 American motion picture produced by Kalem Company and directed by Sidney Olcott with Gene Gauntier, Jack J. Clark and JP McGowan in the leading roles. The action takes place during the Seminoles war, in Florida.

A copy is kept at the Library of Congress, Washington DC.

Production notes
 The film was shot in Jacksonville, Florida.
 IMDb has listing for two Kalem films from 1911. Probably separate listings for the same film.

Cast
 Jack J. Clark - James Ward
 Gene Gauntier - Liza Marsh
 JP McGowan -
George Melford - James Ward (unconfirmed) *2nd IMDb listing
Alice Joyce - Liza (unconfirmed) *2nd IMDb listing

References

External links

 Tangled Lives at IMDb.com(alternate listing]
 Tangled Lives website dedicated to Sidney Olcott

1911 films
Silent American drama films
American silent short films
Films set in Florida
Films shot in Jacksonville, Florida
Films directed by Sidney Olcott
1911 short films
1911 drama films
American black-and-white films
1910s American films